Lompta is a village in the commune of Galim-Tignère in the Adamawa Region of Cameroon. It lies on the left bank of the Beli River.

Population 
In 1971, Lompta contained 493 inhabitants, mainly Fula people.

At the time of the 2005 census, there were 500 people in the village.

References

Bibliography 
 Jean Boutrais (ed.), Peuples et cultures de l'Adamaoua (Cameroun) : Actes du colloque de Ngaoundéré, du 14 au 16 janvier 1992, ORSTOM, Paris ; Ngaoundéré-Anthropos, 1993, 316 p. 
 Dictionnaire des villages de l'Adamaoua, ONAREST, Yaoundé, October 1974, 133 p.

External links 
 Galim-Tignère, sur le site Communes et villes unies du Cameroun (CVUC)

Populated places in Adamawa Region